Mikhail Mikhailovich Morozov (18 February 1897 – 9 May 1952) was a Russian Shakespeare scholar and translator.

Life 
Morozov was educated in England; later, he attended Petrograd University. After his studies, he worked at several Russian theaters and also taught English. In 1935, he was made professor at the Institute of Red Professors. He was responsible for teaching Western literature, with an emphasis on William Shakespeare's works. He was a leader in scholarly societies devoted to Shakespeare and organized his first annual conference on the English dramatist in 1939. 

Morozov wrote several articles and books about Shakespeare, including literary translations. His work as a translator usually relied on collaboration with others, because he did not consider himself a poet. Among his collaborators were the poets Samuil Marshak, Vil'gel'm Levik, and Vadim Shershenevich. His interlinear prose translations included commentaries and were completely new to Soviet research. His editions of Othello and Hamlet were very well-received. After the Second World War, Morozov published a biography of Shakespeare. He suffered discrimination during the "campaign against cosmopolitanism."

References

Further reading 
 Natalya Semenova: Morozov: The Story of a Family and a Lost Collection (Yale University Press, 2020) ISBN 978-0300249828

Translators to Russian
Translators from English
Shakespearean scholars
1952 deaths
1897 births
Literary translators
20th-century Russian translators